Omophlus is a genus of comb-clawed beetles belonging to the family Tenebrionidae subfamily Alleculinae.

Species
Species within this genus include:

 Omophlus agrapha Reitter, 1890 
 Omophlus anatolicus Reitter, 1906 
 Omophlus atticus Reitter, 1906 
 Omophlus baudueri Baudi di Selve, 1877 
 Omophlus blumenthali Muche, 1979 
 Omophlus bodemeyeri Reitter, 1906 
 Omophlus brullei Kirsh, 1869 
 Omophlus candiota Obenberger, 1916 
 Omophlus caucasicus Kirsh, 1869 
 Omophlus compressus Seidlitz, 1896 
 Omophlus crinifer Seidlitz, 1896 
 Omophlus curtus Küster, 1850 
 Omophlus dispar A. Costa, 1847 
 Omophlus dubitatus Reitter, 1906 
 Omophlus emgei Reitter, 1891 
 Omophlus fallaciosus Rottenberg, 1870 
 Omophlus flavipennis Küster, 1850 
 Omophlus glamocensis Obenberger, 1916 
 Omophlus hirsutus Seidlitz, 1869 
 Omophlus hirtus Seidlitz, 1896 
 Omophlus infirmus Kirsch, 1869 
 Omophlus kurda Znojko, 1950 
 Omophlus laciniatus Seidlitz, 1896 
 Omophlus laevigatus Seidlitz, 1896 
 Omophlus lepturoides (Fabricius, 1787) 
 Omophlus lividipes Mulsant, 1856 
 Omophlus longicornis Bertolini, 1868 
 Omophlus lucidus Kirsch, 1869 
 Omophlus luciolus Seidlitz, 1896 
 Omophlus melitensis Baudi, 1877 
 Omophlus nigrinus Reitter, 1889 
 Omophlus nitidicollis Seidlitz, 1896 
 Omophlus oblongus Znojko, 1950 
 Omophlus obscurus Reitter, 1890 
 Omophlus ochraceipennis Faldermann, 1837 
 Omophlus orientalis Mulsant, 1856 
 Omophlus picipes (Fabricius, 1792) 
 Omophlus pilicollis (Ménétriès, 1832) 
 Omophlus pilosellus Kirsch, 1869 
 Omophlus pollinosus Znojko, 1950 
 Omophlus propagatus Kirsch, 1869 
 Omophlus proteus Kirsch, 1869
 Omophlus pruinosus Reitter, 1890 
 Omophlus pubescens (Linnaeus, 1758) 
 Omophlus rugosicollis (Brullé, 1832) 
 Omophlus sandneri Reitter, 1906 
 Omophlus subalpinus (Ménétriès, 1832)
 Omophlus sulcipleuris Seidlitz, 1896 
 Omophlus svaneticus Znojko, 1950
 Omophlus syriacus Mulsant, 1856 
 Omophlus turcicus Kirsch, 1869

References 

Alleculinae
Beetles of Europe